Miriam Jacqueline Stevenson (born July 4, 1933) is an American television host, actress, former model and beauty queen who was crowned Miss Universe 1954. She was the first American to win the title, and had previously been crowned Miss USA 1954. Prior to Miss USA, Stevenson was Miss South Carolina USA 1954. She also represented South Carolina in Miss America 1954 after winning Miss South Carolina 1953, where she placed in the top ten.

At Miss Universe, Stevenson received a tied final score with Martha Rocha of Brazil. In order to break the tie, the woman deemed to have the better physique was crowned the winner, due to a major sponsor of the pageant being Catalina Swimwear. This was determined to be Stevenson, due to having "fitter" hips than Rocha. She was crowned Miss Universe by outgoing titleholder Christiane Martel of France. At the end of her reign, she crowned Hillevi Rombin of Sweden as Miss Universe 1955.

After acting at Universal Studios in Hollywood for one year through a film contract she won as part of her Miss Universe package, Stevenson made headlines in Variety when she announced that she would be returning home to South Carolina to finish her education at Lander University instead of continuing her work in Hollywood. In South Carolina, Stevenson found work hosting television programs for WIS, the local NBC affiliate in Columbia, South Carolina. Here she met her husband Donald Upton; they have two children together, with their son Donald Jr. being a former telecom executive and founder of the global economic development and public affairs firm Fairfield Index, Inc. Until the 1970s, Stevenson was active in the media as a model, television presenter, and actress in national commercials, and also participated as a judge at several Miss Universe competitions.

References

1933 births
20th-century American actresses
American beauty pageant winners
American female models
American film actresses
American television hosts
Lander University alumni
Living people
Miss America 1950s delegates
Miss Universe 1954 contestants
Miss Universe winners
Miss USA winners
People from Winnsboro, South Carolina
21st-century American women